Kyra Christmas (born 14 March 1997) is a Canadian water polo player who is a member of the Canada women's national water polo team. She was part of the team at the 2017 World Aquatics Championships and 2019 Pan American Games. She was part of the team in the women's water polo tournament at the 2020 Summer Olympics.

She played for the University of the Pacific's women's water polo team.

References

External links
 Christmas at swimswam

1997 births
Living people
Canadian female water polo players
Water polo players at the 2019 Pan American Games
Pan American Games silver medalists for Canada
Pan American Games medalists in water polo
Medalists at the 2019 Pan American Games
Water polo players at the 2020 Summer Olympics
Olympic water polo players of Canada
People from High River